May I Sing with Me is the fifth studio album by American indie rock band Yo La Tengo, released in February 1992 by record label Alias. This album is the first with their now-permanent bassist James McNew. The song "Five-Cornered Drone (Crispy Duck)" is a remake of the song "Crispy Duck" with different lyrics.

Track listing

References

External links 

 

1992 albums
Yo La Tengo albums
Alias Records albums